Arete Kerge ( Teemets; born in 1985 in Tallinn) is an Estonian opera singer (soprano).

She studied singing at Estonian Academy of Music and Theatre. Subsequently, she graduated from Conservatorio di Musica Santa Cecilia (master's degree).

Awards:
 2010: First Prize at the Santa Chiara Classical Singing Competition in the category "Sacred Music"
 2014: First Prize at Concours Flame in Paris

Opera roles

 Governess (Britten's "The Turn of the Screw")
 Angelica and Genovieffa (Puccini's "Suor Angelica")
 Fanny (Rossini's "La Cambiale di Matrimonio")

References

External links
 

Living people
1985 births
Estonian operatic sopranos
21st-century Estonian women opera singers
Estonian Academy of Music and Theatre alumni
Conservatorio Santa Cecilia alumni
Singers from Tallinn